Milejów-Osada  is a village in Łęczna County, Lublin Voivodeship, in eastern Poland. It is the seat of the gmina (administrative district) called Gmina Milejów.

The village has a population of 2,613.

References

Villages in Łęczna County